Flamma (lit. The Flame) was a Syrian gladiator under the Roman Empire during the reign of Hadrian. He was one of the most famous and successful of his time.

History 
How Flamma ended up as a gladiator is unknown. He may have been a revolutionary Syrian or a dissatisfied Roman auxiliary. He was most likely forced into slavery and then into a gladiator school. He fought as a secutor, a class of gladiators in Rome. His common opponents were thus retiarii. Fighters were granted retirement or freedom if they showed great skill and bravery; in doing so they were rewarded with a wooden baton known as rudius. Flamma was awarded the rudius four times, but each time he refused this freedom and chose to remain a gladiator. The number of fights Flamma engaged in is higher than most gladiators. Many have lower numbers like Purricina Iuvenus (ILS 5107) who fought 5 times or Glaucus of Modena (ILS 5121) who fought 7 times. Flamma had fought 34 times and won 21 of them. He also achieved old age for a gladiator, dying at age 30 while many died in their early 20s.

His gravestone in Sicily includes his record and reads in Latin:

Which translates as: "Flamma, secutor, lived 30 years, fought 34 times, won 21 times, fought to a draw 9 times, won reprieve 4 times, a Syrian by nationality. Delicatus (a gladiator) made this for his deserving comrade-in-arms."

References 

Roman gladiators